Peruvian Universities (commonly known as PU) is an inter-university student club, aimed at promoting debate and discussion on current national and international issues with the objective of making the leading citizens who contribute to development by participating in Model United Nations (MUN) conferences around the globe. Beginning its participation in international conferences in 2006, the United Nations Studies Circle (CENU) became the Peruvian Association for the Study of the United Nations (AENU Peru for its Spanish acronym), a non-for-profit NGO charged with task of promoting MUN in Peru and creating Peru's first "National Delegation", using past experience to select the finest delegates from Peru's finest universities, creating then Peruvian Universities.  In addition to its debate team, AENU Peru also has a volunteer program (Accion AENU) and organizes the largest national Model UN conference annually since 2012 (LiMUN). In January 2015 AENU Peru and Peruvian Universities Debate Team successfully hosted the annual Harvard National Model United Nations Latin America (HNMUNLA) conference in Lima, Peru.

Since its foundation in 2010, their participation in Model UN conferences yielded multiple awards in national and international conferences. Peruvian Universities Debate Team has been ranked as one of the top international debate teams around the world in 2011, 2012 and 2013; being included in the World's Best International Model UN Teams 2015-2016 and ranked #10 at the Best College Model UN Teams - World Division: International Top 20. Being the first Model UN Peruvian force, it's the Peruvian delegation with more Best Delegate Awards (four earned in 2012, 2013, 2015 and 2016 respectively) and the one with more prizes in a single HNMUN conference (eleven in 2015). The debate team has also won the Best Large Delegation Award at Harvard World Model United Nations 2014 and at Harvard National Model United Nations Latin America 2017.

Most recently, the team attained the Best Small Delegation award at the Harvard World Model United Nations 2022, sharing the title with rival delegation Peruvian Debate Society (PDS).

Directors of Peruvian Universities

Harvard National Model United Nations Participation

Harvard World Model United Nations Participation 

Since 2016, former Peruvian Universities award winners have started to participate in Harvard World Model United Nations as part of the Substantial Affairs Team.

Harvard National Model United Nations Latin America Participation 

Since 2015, former Peruvian Universities award winners have started to participate in Harvard National Model United Nations Latin America as part of the Host Team and the Substantial Affairs Team.

Oxford International Model United Nations Participation 

Since 2015, former Peruvian Universities award winners have started to participate in Oxford International Model United Nations as part of the Substantial Affairs Team.

Universidad del Rosario Model United Nations Participation 

Since 2015, former Peruvian Universities award winners have started to participate in Universidad del Rosario Model United Nations as part of the Staff Team.

National Model United Nations Circuit Participation

Pontificia Universidad Católica del Peru Model United Nations (PUCPMUN)

Universidad del Pacífico Model United Nations (UPMUN) 

Since UPMUN's starting run in 2011, Peruvian Universities alumni have participated as part of the Substantial Affairs Team.

Universidad San Ignacio de Loyola Model United Nations (USILMUN)

Universidad Privada del Norte Model United Nations (UPNMUN)

International Delegation of Peru Model United Nations (IDPMUN)

Modelo de Naciones Unidas del Perú (MONUP)

Notes

References

Student debating societies